The North Pinyon Mountains are a mountain range in San Diego County, California, USA.

References 

Mountain ranges of Southern California
Mountain ranges of San Diego County, California